Operation Badlands was part of the Iraq War that began in 2003. Operation Badlands began on 12 April 2005, Iraqi Security Forces (ISF) and United States Marines with 1st Battalion, 6th Marine Regiment, together with supporting mechanized elements from Regimental Combat Team-8, moved to secure the town of Saqlawiyah, 5 miles northwest of the city of Fallujah, and establish a base of operations there. As part of the operation, ISF personnel and Marines from Company A, conducted security and stability operations designed to root out insurgent activity and illegal weapons caches. The troops also worked with civil affairs Marines to help rebuild the community, determining what facilities, such as water pumps and power stations, need to be replaced or restored. No US or Iraqi casualties or deaths were reported during the operation.

References

 Global Security
 Marine Corps News 

Military operations of the Iraq War involving the United States
Military operations of the Iraq War involving Iraq
Military operations of the Iraq War in 2005
Iraqi insurgency (2003–2011)
United States Marine Corps in the Iraq War